The Cheng Hoon Teng Temple (also called as the Temple of Green Cloud) is a Chinese temple practising the Three Doctrinal Systems of Buddhism, Confucianism and Taoism located at No. 25 Jalan Tokong, Malacca City, Malaysia. It is the oldest functioning temple in the country.

History 
The temple site was founded during the era of Dutch Malacca by the Chinese Kapitans Tay Kie Ki Tay Hong Yong in 1645. Additional structures were then constructed in 1673 under the leadership of Kapitan Li Wei King Koon Chang with materials imported from China. The temple served as the main place of worship for the local Hoklo (Hokkien) community. Kapitan Chan Ki Lock constructed a main hall for the temple in 1704. In 1801, the temple structures were renovated under the leadership of Kapitan Chua Su Cheong Tok Ping who was the father of Choa Chong Long, the first Kapitan of Singapore, with the addition of additional structures.

In 1962, then abbot Seck Kim Seng ordained Houn Jiyu-Kennett, a Zen nun from England and the future founder of the Order of Buddhist Contemplatives, at this temple. The temple was awarded a UNESCO award for outstanding architectural restoration in 2003.

Features 
The temple is situated close to Jalan Tukang Emas, also known as "Harmony Street" because of its proximity to the Kampung Kling Mosque and Sri Poyatha Moorthi Temple, covering an area of 4,600 m2. Featuring a magnificent main gate along Jalan Tokong, the temple consists of a complex of several prayer halls with a large main prayer hall dedicated to the goddess of mercy, Guan Yin. Additional smaller prayer quarters were added later. One of these is dedicated to the Chinese deities of wealth, longevity and propagation, while another dedicated to ancestral tablets. One of the main features of the temple is the seven-metre red flag-pole facing the left wing of the main prayer hall, which houses the remains of two of the three Kapitans who contributed to the construction of the temple. Across the road is a traditional opera theatre which forms a part of the temple complex. The building conforms to the principles of feng shui where the complex is laid out to ensure a view of the river and high ground on either side.

See also 
 Poh San Teng Temple
 Xiang Lin Si Temple
 List of tourist attractions in Malacca

References

External links 
 
 

1645 establishments in the Dutch Empire
Chinese-Malaysian culture
Buddhist temples in Malaysia
Confucian temples in Malaysia
Taoist temples in Malaysia
Religious buildings and structures completed in 1645
Tourist attractions in Malacca
Buildings and structures in Malacca City
Guanyin temples
17th-century Buddhist temples
17th-century Taoist temples
17th-century Confucian temples